Al-Ain Saudi Football Club is a Saudi Arabian professional association football club based in Al Atawlah, Al Qara, Al Bahah. The club was founded in 1978 and play their home matches at the King Saud Sport City Stadium. The team compete in the MS League, the second tier of Saudi football. The club was founded in 1978 under the name of Zahran Football Club. The club was named after the Zahran tribe who are one of the largest tribes in Al-Bahah Province. In 2001, the club changed their name to Al-Ameed Football Club before changing their name to Al-Ain in 2013.

Al-Ain have won the Saudi Third Division title once in 2015–16, and finished as runners-up once in 2010–11. The club have won the Al-Bahah Regional League ten times. The club spent four non-consecutive seasons in the Saudi Second Division before gaining to the MS League in the 2017–18 season. They spent two consecutive seasons in the MS League before gaining promotion to the top tier of Saudi football for the first time at the end of the 2019–20 season. The club play their home games at the King Saud Sport City Stadium in Al Bahah, sharing the stadium with derby rivals Al-Hejaz.

Honours

Domestic
Saudi First Division/MS League
Third place (1): 2019–20

Saudi Third Division
Winners (1): 2015–16
Runners-up (1): 2010–11

Regional
Al-Bahah Regional League
Winners (10): 1981, 1998, 2000, 2001, 2004, 2005, 2006, 2009, 2010, 2011

Current squad 
As of 29 September 2021
{|
|-
| valign="top" |
{| class="wikitable"
|-
! style="color:yellow; background: #000099; border:2px solid Red;"|No
! style="color:yellow; background: #000099; border:2px solid Red;"|Position
! style="color:yellow; background: #000099; border:2px solid Red;"|Player
! style="color:yellow; background: #000099; border:2px solid Red;"|Nation
|-

Managerial history

 Bahaa Qebsisi (August 5, 2015 – November 5, 2016)
 Abbas Noureddine (November 11, 2016 – February 22, 2017)
 Hamood Al-Saiari (June 12, 2017 – December 3, 2017)
 Mohammed Dahmane (December 8, 2017 – April 1, 2018)
 Mohamed Al Maalej (May 3, 2018 – February 8, 2019)
 Alen Horvat (February 9, 2019 – May 20, 2019)
 Habib Ben Romdhane (June 19, 2019 – September 22, 2020)
 Michael Skibbe (October 12, 2020 – January 28, 2021)
 Pablo Machín (January 31, 2021 – May 31, 2021)
 Hamood Al-Saiari (August 13, 2021 – October 27, 2021)
 Faisal Al-Ghamdi (caretaker) (October 27, 2021 – November 8, 2021)
 Mohamed Mkacher (November 8, 2021 – June 1, 2022)
 Mohammed Dahmane (August 11, 2022 – November 17, 2022)
 Didier Gomes Da Rosa (November 17, 2022 – )

Presidential history
As of 1 January 2021.

References

Ain
Ain
Ain
Ain